Soulshaker (also known as Soul Shakers) is a dance, club, and pop music production team based in the United Kingdom. In addition to creating their own productions, they write, produce, mix, and remix tracks for a number of major and independent labels in the United Kingdom, Europe, and North America.

Soulshaker consists of Warren Meyers and Matt Meyers. In 2009, they were awarded the Music Industry Recognition Award (MIRA) in the "Best Dance Music Producers" category, having previously won the same award in the 'Best Remix of 2008' category for their mix of Lindsay Lohan's "Bossy" on Universal Records.

To date, Soulshaker have been a part of twelve Number 1 UK Club Chart hits, and more than 35 top 40 UK Dance Chart hits. In one week during March 2009, the Soulshaker name was involved in 14% of the tracks that made up the entire Top 60 UK Music Week Dance Chart.

In 2009, Soulshaker was commissioned to remix over 20 high-profile releases by various major and independent labels for artists including Chaka Khan & Mary J. Blige (SonyBMG US/Megafan), Keri Hilson (Timbaland/Universal), Paul Harris & Steve Mac (Ego Music), Robin S (Champion), Lindsay Lohan (Universal US), Alexander O'Neal (EMI), Wiz Khalifa (Warner Bros), Judge Jules (Maelstrom), Crystal Waters (Trackworks US) and Shanie (AATW). They were also the only UK dance production team to be commissioned to remix the recent double Grammy Award–winning track "Disrespectful" by Chaka Khan and Mary J. Blige.

Soulshaker have DJ'd at clubs all over the world, including Ministry of Sound, Es Paradis, Space, Bar M, Camden Palace, Clockwork Orange, Eden, Twilo, The Turnmills, Powerzone, Fabric, Aquarium, Moneypenny's, Koko, and The End. They have also performed on numerous radio shows including BBC Radio One with Judge Jules and Seb Fontaine, and Kiss 100 with Graham Gold.

In addition to their other work, Soulshaker runs a production company called 'Audiofreaks' and are the owners of the recording studio complex at London Bridge called The Vineyard, formerly known as The Hit Factory, where they now house names like Hed Kandi, Data, Mn2S, The Young Punx, and Phonat in their various recording studios.

Discography

Singles
2006 "Hypnotic Erotic Games" with Lorraine Brown
2007 "Shame Shame Shame" with CeCe Peniston

External links
 Soulshaker Homepage
 Audiofreaks Homepage

Music companies of the United Kingdom